The Carolina Film Institute (CFI) is a film school, founded in Greenville, South Carolina in 2008. It is affiliated with Seattle Film Institute founded in Seattle in 1994. CFI offers both part-time classes and certificate programs in film and digital video production, and film history.

Curriculum
CFI offers both full-time and part-time programs.

The 40 Week Total Immersion Filmmaking Program awards a Certificate in Film Production upon the completion of all classes. The Program includes the production of 10 group and individual film and video projects, the writing of a complete feature-length screenplay and a comprehensive grounding in Film History. Classes meet 5 days a week, 4 hours each day. The core classes are: Film History and Analysis, Screenwriting, The Production Process, Documentary and Non-Fiction Filmmaking and Digital Post Production.

Part-time program classes are offered individually both evenings and weekends. As of the Spring 2009 term, CFI began offering a new part-time certificate program in filmmaking, that allows part-time students to earn a certificate by enrolling in classes over time, or to combine with courses in the full-time program. Part-time classes cover film production, video production, film history, editing, lighting, and audio editing, among others.

CFI is licensed by the South Carolina Commission on Higher Education.

Facilities

The school occupies a  building used for administration, classrooms, editing labs and film equipment checkout. Production equipment includes Arriflex 16mm and Super16mm, and Super8 cameras; Digital Video and HDV cameras, Final Cut Pro editing stations, lighting, grip equipment, and audio gear.

References
Carolina Film Institute Catalog, 2008

Film schools in the United States
Education in Greenville, South Carolina
Educational institutions established in 2008
2008 establishments in South Carolina